USS San Bernardino County (LST–1110) was an  built for the United States Navy during World War II.  Named for San Bernardino County, California, she was the only U.S. Naval vessel to bear the name.

Construction and career 
LST-1110 was laid down on 28 December 1944 by the Missouri Valley Bridge and Iron Company of Evansville, Indiana; launched on 9 February 1945, sponsored by Mrs. Sidney Kolb; placed in reduced commission for transit to New Orleans on 1 March 1945; and commissioned in full on 7 March 1945.

Service in the United States Navy

World War II, 1945
Following shakedown off Florida, LST-1110 loaded creosote, piles, asphalt, and an LCT and departed New Orleans for Pearl Harbor on 15 April. From Oahu, she carried her cargo on to the Marianas; offloaded the piles and asphalt at Guam; took on gasoline drums at Saipan; and, on 20 June, sailed for Okinawa. She offloaded her cargo onto the Hagushi beaches and embarked elements of the 6th Marines between 26 June and 10 July; then sailed back to Guam, where she discharged her passengers. Availability at Saipan followed; and, at the end of the month, she moved on to the Solomons to load cargo for the Philippines.

Post-war activities, 1945
The war ended on 15 August; and, four days later, LST-1110 departed Guadalcanal. On the 30th, she anchored off Calicoan Island and completed offloading by 11 September. The LST then shifted to San Pedro Bay, whence she proceeded to Lingayen Gulf to join Amphibious Group 8 to participate in the occupation of eastern Honshū. Departing Luzon on 26 September, LST-1110 disembarked elements of the 8th Field Artillery, 25th Division, I Army Corps, at Nagoya on 25 and 26 October; then got underway to return to Lingayen Gulf. In November, she transported Quartermaster Corps personnel to Sasebo, then sailed east. On the 27th, she arrived at Iwo Jima; embarked 20th Air Force personnel; and continued on to Saipan where she discharged her passengers on 5 December. LST-1110 remained at Saipan through December; and, on 8 January 1946, she sailed for Pearl Harbor and the California coast.

1946–1953
Arriving at San Pedro on 11 February 1946, she underwent overhaul at Long Beach; and, in June, proceeded to San Diego where she reported to ComPhibPac for duty. For the next two years, she provided amphibious training and logistic support services along the West Coast.

Then, in the summer of 1948, she commenced the first of many Arctic logistic support missions. Later joined by the ice breaker, she reached Nome on the 29th; and, on the 31st, moved on to other northern stations: Point Lay, Barter Island, and Point Barrow. In mid-August, she began to move south again and arrived at Long Beach on the 28th. On 16 September, she returned to San Diego and resumed amphibious training and logistics operations along the California coast. For the next five years, she maintained a similar schedule, operating in the arctic during the summer and off California for the remainder of each year.

1953–1957
In the fall of 1953, LST-1110 was dispatched to Hawaii for winter training exercises. In February 1953, she returned to San Diego; and, in September, she sailed west again for her first peacetime deployment to the Far East. Departing San Diego on the 20th, she arrived at Yokosuka, Japan on 22 October and began six months of cargo operations and training exercises in Japanese and Korean waters. On 12 April 1955 she departed Inchon for home and arrived at San Diego on the 28th. At the end of June, LST-1110 resumed Arctic resupply operations; and, on 1 July, while deployed, she was named USS San Bernardino County.

She returned to Southern California in October and remained there until February 1956, when she was transferred to Pearl Harbor. She arrived at her new home port on 2 March, conducted operations from there through May; but, in June, she again sailed north. Her reassignment to Pearl Harbor did not change her summer deployments; and, in that year and in 1957, she carried supplies to Arctic bases. On 13 September 1957, she completed her last Alaskan mission.

USS San Bernardino County was struck from the Naval Vessel Register on 6 February 1959.

Service in the Republic of China Navy 
On 31 December 1957, she was placed in commission, in reserve; and, on 15 August 1958 she was decommissioned for transfer to the Republic of China in Pearl Harbor, Hawaii, and was transferred to Republic of China for use in accordance with the Sino-US Mutual Defense Treaty. The handover ceremony was donated by Major General Solomon, Commander of the 14th Military Region of the United States, and received by the representative of Colonel Zheng Tianjie, the military attache in the United States.

She was commissioned on 15 August 1958 as Chung Chiang (LST-225).

The ship has participated in the replenishment mission to the Kinmen Outer Island during the 823 artillery battle. In the fierce fire of the Communist army, thanks to the cooperation of all officers and soldiers of the ship, the excellent craftsmanship, shuttle and replenishment, successfully fulfilled the mission.

Due to the gradual decline in transportation and replenishment tasks, her and other LSTs were ordered to be simply mothballed on 27 January 1989.

Chung Chiang was discarded by the Republic of China in 1993, her final fate unknown.

Awards
LST-1110 received one battle star for World War II service.

References

External links
 LST-1110 Home Port
 USSLST1110.ORG

LST-542-class tank landing ships
1945 ships
History of San Bernardino County, California
Ships built in Evansville, Indiana
World War II amphibious warfare vessels of the United States
Cold War amphibious warfare vessels of the United States
LST-542-class tank landing ships of the Republic of China Navy